Chilostoma adelozona is a species of medium-sized, air-breathing, land snail, a terrestrial pulmonate gastropod mollusk in the family Helicidae, the true snails. The species is endemic to Switzerland, and is currently Vulnerable.

References

Chilostoma